Regan Lee Mandryk is a Professor of Computer Science at the University of Saskatchewan. She specializes in Human-computer interaction.

Early life and education
Mandryk was born on December 9, 1975, in Winnipeg, Manitoba. Mandryk earned her Bachelor of Science degree from the University of Winnipeg in 1997. She completed her Master's degree and PhD at Simon Fraser University in British Columbia. Mandryk's PhD dissertation applied physiological measures to model user emotion in interactive play environments. She was awarded the 2005 Dean of Graduate Studies Convocation Medal in Applied Sciences and was nominated for the Canadian Association of Graduate Studies Distinguished Dissertation Award. She then completed post-doctoral fellowships at the University of British Columbia and Dalhousie University.

Career
Upon completing her fellowships, Mandryk joined the University of Saskatchewan's Human-Computer Interaction Lab under the guidance of Carl Gutwin to research video games. She had originally never looked at the university for she had no family connections to Saskatoon but was convinced by Gutwin's work. As an assistant professor, she co-received a Natural Sciences and Engineering Research Council grant to study how to increase university-aged students physical activity. Alongside Kevin Stanley, they developed a game called Gemini which would incorporate a player's real-world activities such as walking, running or riding a bicycle into a role-playing computer game.

In January 2015, Mandryk was selected as an inaugural member of the Royal Society of Canada’s College of New Scholars, Artists and Scientists. She later received the University of Saskatchewan's New Researcher Award. The following year, Mandryk and researchers at the Interaction Lab began developing concentration exercises to assist children with fetal alcohol spectrum disorder. Their game involved the player's avatar runs endlessly forward, collecting coins and avoiding obstacles, while the player wore a headset to monitor their brain activity. Through the use of positive reinforcement, Mandryk's research team were attempting to train those with fetal alcohol spectrum disorder to focus. She also received a $1.65 million grant to create a graduate program in game-user research for the Saskatchewan Waterloo Games User Research Initiative.

Mandryk later began researching whether video games could be used to assess mental health. This project earned her a E.W.R. Steacie Memorial Fellowship, $250,000 over two years, by the Natural Sciences and Engineering Research Council of Canada to fund her research. During the COVID-19 pandemic in North America, Mandryk promoted the use of video games while isolating as a way to deal with stress, anxiety and other mental health challenges. She said that due to social isolation, children were missing out on interactions with their friends and video games were a way to socialize.

References

External links

Living people
1975 births
University of Winnipeg alumni
Academic staff of the University of Saskatchewan
Simon Fraser University alumni
Video game researchers